Dunnerdale-with-Seathwaite is a former civil parish in the South Lakeland district of the English county of Cumbria. In the 2001 census the parish had a population of 129, decreasing at the 2011 census to 119. Since 1976 the parish has been governed by Duddon Parish Council.

See also

Listed buildings in Dunnerdale-with-Seathwaite

References

External links
 A Vision of Britain Through Time
 British History Online
 British Listed Buildings
Cumbria County History Trust: Dunnerdale with Seathwaite (nb: provisional research only – see Talk page)
 Genuki
 Geograph
 Office for National Statistics

South Lakeland District
Former civil parishes in Cumbria